Thea Bjelde (born 5 June 2000) is a Norwegian footballer who plays for Vålerenga and the Norway national team.

Club career

Early career 
She started her career in Sogndal, where she distinguished herself as the only girl on the G14 team at the Norway Cup in 2014.  In the 2016 spring season she played for Kaupanger in the 2nd division.

Arna-Bjørnar (2016–2021) 
As a 16-year-old, she was brought to Arna-Bjørnar in the Toppserien. In 2018, the breakthrough came when Bjelde had a fantastic season, and was an important piece in the team that won bronze in the Toppserien.  She was voted player of the year in Arna-Bjørnar, and nominated for breakthrough of the year in 2022 in the Toppserien. 

In early 2019, she suffered a cruciate ligament injury that put her out of football for a year.  After returning from the injury, she bounced back strongly the following year, and was rewarded by being selected for the senior national team for the first time.  She was also named player of the year in Arna-Bjørnar in 2020.  As a 21-year-old, she was appointed captain in Arna-Bjørnar.

Vålerenga (2021–) 
On 18 July 2021, she signed for Vålerenga.  With Vålerenga, she helped win the cup championship in her first season, and she was voted best on the pitch in the cup final against Sandviken.

National team career 
Bjelde has international matches for U15, U16, U17, U19, U23, and the senior national team for Norway.

She was selected for the senior Norwegian national team for the first time in October 2020.

After a decline in the Norwegian squad, Bjelde was called up to the team that was going to the European Championship in England 2022.

Bjelde made her debut for the senior national team on 7 October 2022, in a private international match against Brazil at Ullevaal Stadium.

External links 

 Thea Bjelde - WorldFootball.net
 Thea Bjelde/ – Soccerway
 Thea Bjelde – Norwegian Football Association 
 Thea Bjelde – Soccerdonna
 Thea Bjelde – FBref

References 

Living people
2000 births
Norwegian women's footballers
Association football midfielders
Women's association football midfielders
Norway women's youth international footballers
Norway women's international footballers
People from Sogndal